The 2016 Queensland Handball League is a Brisbane based championship for Handball. It is a home and away structure conducted in April to July 2016, with the winning team qualifying for the National Club Championship. The competition was not held due to a combined Queensland team called the Brisbane Wolves competing in the 2016 Australian Handball Club Championship, 2016 Oceania Handball Champions Cup and the 2016 Australian Handball League.

The North Brisbane Pre-Season Competition was held in February and was a mixed male and female teams competition (similar to University Games rules) which was won by the Panthers Green team.

The Junior competition was run by Northern Panthers Handball Association and held during the second school term (April–June 2016) for the third season and featured three mixed boys and girls teams, won by North Brisbane.

The inaugural Brisbane Schools Handball Championship was held at Brisbane State High School with over one hundred participants in three sections. The Junior Boys was won by St Patrick's College, Shorncliffe after defeating Brisbane State High School 1. Mt Gravatt High School were third. The Junior Girls saw Brisbane State High School Yellow win. The Youth Boys was a tie between the two Brisbane State High School teams.

Standings

Brisbane Schools Championship

Junior Boys

Final

Junior Girls

Final

Youth Boys

North Brisbane Pre-Season Competition

North Brisbane Junior Competition

References

External links
 Northern Panthers webpage
 Handball Queensland webpage
 Northern University Games - Unisport webpage

Handball competitions in Australia
2016 in Australian sport
2016 in handball
2016–17 domestic handball leagues